List of Susquehanna River crossings proceeding upstream from the river mouth at the Chesapeake Bay in Maryland, United States, generally northward through Pennsylvania toward the main branch headwaters in New York.  The West Branch crossings are listed afterward.

This list includes active road, railroad, foot, and trail bridges, dams, fords, ferries, and historic crossings. Presently it does not include historic ferry crossings. Railroad lines are generally as shown on the USGS topographic maps, which may not have been updated to reflect the creation of Conrail in the 1970s, which absorbed many lines in this area.

Main Branch 
Main Branch crossings are listed from the mouth of the river in the Chesapeake Bay up to the source at Otsego Lake in Cooperstown, New York.

In a geological sense, the Chesapeake Bay is just the ria, submerged valley, of the Susquehanna River. In that sense the Chesapeake Bay Bridge Tunnel and the Chesapeake Bay Bridge crossings precede those in the conventional list below.

Maryland

Pennsylvania

York County – Lancaster County

Dauphin, York, and Lancaster Counties

Dauphin County – York County

Dauphin County – Cumberland County (Harrisburg area)

Dauphin County – Perry County

Snyder County – Northumberland County

Northumberland, Montour, and Columbia Counties

Luzerne County

Wyoming and Bradford Counties

New York

Tioga County

Western Broome County (Binghamton Area)

Pennsylvania

Susquehanna County

New York

Eastern Broome County

Chenango County

Otsego County / Delaware County

Otsego County

West Branch Susquehanna River 
From Sunbury up the western branch to the headwaters.

Pennsylvania

Northumberland/Union and Lycoming Counties, Williamsport

Clinton County

Centre and eastern Clearfield Counties

Western Clearfield County

Indiana and Cambria Counties

See also

References 

Susquehanna River
Susquehanna River
Susquehanna River
Susquehanna River
Susquehanna
Crossings of the Susquehanna River